Divine presence, presence of God, Inner God, or simply presence is a concept in religion, spirituality, and theology that deals with the ability of God to be "present" with human beings.

According to some types of monotheism God is omnipresent; hence, the rabbinic teaching: "The Divine presence is everywhere."

Conceptualizations
The concept is shared by many religious traditions, is found in a number of independently derived conceptualizations, and each of these has culturally distinct terminology. Some of the various relevant concepts and terms are:
 Immanence – usually applied in monotheistic, pantheistic, pandeistic, or panentheistic faiths to suggest that the spiritual world permeates the mundane. It is often contrasted with transcendence, in which the divine is seen to be outside the material world.
 Inner light – in various religions, the presence of God as a "light". The Religious Society of Friends regards this concept as a fundamental belief.
 Divine light – an aspect of divine presence with qualities of illumination: thought, intellect, knowledge, insight, wisdom, being, divine love.
 Numen – Latin term for "presence", used historically to refer to a Roman religious concept.
 Theophany – the appearance of a deity to a human.
 Higher consciousness–is the consciousness of a higher Self, transcendental reality, or God.

Abrahamic religions

Judaism
 Angel of the Presence – an entity variously considered angelic or else identified with God himself.
 Shekhinah – the dwelling or settling of the divine presence of God and his cosmic glory.
The Sages of Israel have given expression of the Divine Presence (Hebrew: Shekhinah) in their writings:

Christianity

 Immanuel – "God with us," is a Biblical concept that deals with the concept of divine presence, often used by Christians as a title for Jesus
 Incarnation (Christianity) – Believed to be the second person of the Trinity, also known as God the Son or the Logos (Word), "became flesh" by being conceived in the womb of Mary.

Christians generally recognize a special presence of Christ in the Eucharist, although they differ about exactly how, where, and when Christ is present. While all agree that there is no perceptible change in the elements, some believe that they actually become the body and blood of Christ, others believe the true body and blood of Christ are really present in, with, and under the bread and wine which remain physically unchanged, others believe in a real but purely spiritual presence of Christ in the Eucharist, and still others take the act to be only a symbolic reenactment of the Last Supper.
  – Catholic and Orthodox (terminology differs) concept of Christ fully, truly and substantially present in the Eucharist with the physical species being substantially absent.

  – Lutheran concept of Christ being "infused" within the species of communion with these aspects still substantially present.

Indian religions
In Hinduism, an avatar is the appearance or incarnation of a deity on Earth.

See also
 Incarnation
 Logos (Christianity)
 The Kingdom of God Is Within You

References

Bibliography 

 Borgen, Peder. Early Christianity and Hellenistic Judaism. Edinburgh: T & T Clark Publishing. 1996.
 Brown, Raymond. An Introduction to the New Testament. New York: Doubleday. 1997.
 Dunn, J. D. G. Christology in the Making. London: SCM Press. 1989.
 Dupuis, Jacques. Christianity and the Religions. Maryknoll, NY: Orbis. 2002.
 Ferguson, Everett. Backgrounds in Early Christianity. Grand Rapids: Eerdmans Publishing. 1993.
 Greene, Colin J. D. Christology in Cultural Perspective: Marking Out the Horizons. Grand Rapids: InterVarsity Press. Eerdmans Publishing. 2003.
 Letham, Robert. The Work of Christ. Downers Grove: InterVarsity Press. 1993.
 Macleod, Donald. The Person of Christ. Downers Grove: InterVarsity Press. 1998.
 McGrath, Alister. Historical Theology: An Introduction to the History of Christian Thought. Oxford: Blackwell Publishing. 1998.

 Macquarrie, J. Jesus Christ in Modern Thought. London: SCM Press. 1990.
 Neusner, Jacob. From Politics to Piety: The Emergence of Pharisaic Judaism. Providence, R. I.: Brown University. 1973.
 Norris, Richard A. Jr. The Christological Controversy. Philadelphia: Fortress Press. 1980.
 O'Collins, Gerald. Christology: A Biblical, Historical, and Systematic Study of Jesus. Oxford:Oxford University Press. 2009.
 ___ Jesus: A Portrait. London: Darton, Longman & Todd. 2008.
 ___ Salvation for All: God's Other Peoples. Oxford:Oxford University Press. 2008.
 Pelikan, Jaroslav. Development of Christian Doctrine: Some Historical Prolegomena. London: Yale University Press. 1969.
 ___ The Emergence of the Catholic Tradition (100-600). Chicago: University of Chicago Press. 1971.
 Rahner, Karl. Foundations of Christian Faith, trans. W.V. Dych. London: Darton, Longman & Todd. 1978.
 Tyson, John R. Invitation to Christian Spirituality: An Ecumenical Anthology. New York: Oxford University Press. 1999.

Theology